Dilao, former name for Paco, Manila
Fort Santiago
Vigan
Rizal Shrine
Intramuros
Malacañan Palace
EDSA Shrine
Corregidor
Mendiola
Zapote Bridge
Nagcarlan Underground Cemetery
Kadiwa Park
Biak na Bato National Park, San Miguel, Bulacan
Jones Bridge
Mount Samat, Bataan
Luneta Park
Krus ni Magellan, Cebu
Barasoain Church, Malolos, Bulacan
Aguinaldo Shrine
Lion's Head
Jamboree Lake

Historic sites